Ivanovka is a rural locality (a selo) and the administrative center of Ivanovskoye Rural Settlement, Yelansky District, Volgograd Oblast, Russia. The population was 244 as of 2010.

Geography 
Ivanovka is located on Khopyorsko-Buzulukskaya Plain, on the bank of the Yelan River, 20 km southwest of Yelan (the district's administrative centre) by road. Trostyanka is the nearest rural locality.

References 

Rural localities in Yelansky District